Nekodim is a village in Ferizaj Municipality, Kosovo. According to the Kosovo Agency of Statistics (KAS) estimate from the 2011 census, there were 3,718 people residing in Nekodim, with Albanians constituting the majority of the population.

History
On September 12-13 1943, during World War II, many of the village's Serb civilian population were murdered by Albanian paramilitaries.

Notes

References 

Villages in Ferizaj